The Kosovo national rugby union team is the national rugby union side representing Kosovo.

History
The Kosovo Rugby Federation was established in September 2018 and was accepted into Rugby Europe during their 103rd meeting on 3 December 2021. The Kosovo national rugby union team is expected to play its first competitive match on 1 April 2023 at home to Austria in the 2022–23 Rugby Europe International Championships, Development tier.

Competitive record

Rugby Europe International Championships

Fixtures and results

2023

Head-to-head record

See also
Kosovo national rugby sevens team

References

External links
Kosovo Rugby Federation

National rugby union teams
R